Dimitar Savov (born 29 January 1998) is a Bulgarian professional footballer who plays as a defender for Minyor Pernik.

References

External links

1998 births
Living people
Bulgarian footballers
Bulgaria youth international footballers
First Professional Football League (Bulgaria) players
PFC Minyor Pernik players
FC CSKA 1948 Sofia players
Association football defenders